Eliudis Benítez Hani (3 September 1954 – 29 April 2018) was a Puerto Rican judoka. He competed in the men's half-heavyweight event at the 1976 Summer Olympics.

References

External links
 

1954 births
2018 deaths
Puerto Rican male judoka
Olympic judoka of Puerto Rico
Judoka at the 1976 Summer Olympics